Treaty of Novgorod may refer to
 Treaty of Novgorod (1326)
 Treaty of Novgorod (1537)
 Treaty of Novgorod (1557)
 Treaty of Novgorod (1561)